Young Roscoe Philaphornia is the debut studio album by American rapper Roscoe. It was released on June 10, 2003 via Priority Records. Production was handled by Organized Noize, J. Wells, the Co-Stars, Caspa, Def Jef, DJ Quik, Fingazz, L.T. Hutton, Soopafly and Soul G, with Andrew Shack and Kurupt serving as executive producers. It features guest appearances from Kokane, LaToiya Williams, Sleepy Brown and Youth Authority. The album peaked at number 148 on the Billboard 200 and number 22 on the Top R&B/Hip-Hop Albums. Its singles, "Head to Toe" and "Smooth Sailin'", made it to Hot R&B/Hip-Hop Songs at #95 and #73, respectively.

Track listing

Sample credits
 Track 5 contains samples of "Brazilian Rhyme", written by Maurice White and performed by Earth, Wind & Fire

Personnel

David "Roscoe" Williams – main artist
Patrick "Sleepy" Brown – featured artist (track 2), producer (tracks: 11, 13)
LaToiya Williams – featured artist (track 3)
Jerry "Kokane" Long, Jr. – featured artist (track 4)
B. "Young Bizzle" Pettaway – featured artist (track 12)
E. "Tri Star" McKinney – featured artist (track 12)
S. "YG" Huggins – featured artist (track 12)
Jasmine McGruder – additional vocals (track 6)
LaChrisha McClendon-McLemore – additional vocals (track 9)
Richard Stites – drums & keyboards (track 11)
John "Fingazz" Stary – producer (track 1)
Ray Murray – producer (tracks: 2, 11, 13)
Rico Wade – producer (tracks: 2, 11, 13)
Priest "Soopafly" Brooks – producer (track 3)
Ted "Caspa" Hogan – producer (track 4)
Jeffrey "Def Jef" Forston – producer (track 5)
Gerald "Soul G." Stevens – producer (track 5)
Jon "J. Wells" Henderson – producer (tracks: 6, 12)
Lenton Terrell Hutton – producer (track 7)
David "DJ Quik" Blake – engineering & producer (track 8)
Neely Dinkins Jr. – producer (tracks: 9, 10)
Vito Colapietro – producer (tracks: 9, 10)
Andrew M. Shack – executive producer
Ricardo "Kurupt" Brown – executive producer
Carlos Warlick – mixing (tracks: 1, 2, 4, 9, 10, 13)
Dave Aaron – mixing (track 3)
Nick Ferrero – mixing (track 5)
Jeremy McKenzie – mixing (track 6)
Brian Springer – mixing (track 7)
Brian Sumner – assistant mixing (tracks: 1, 4, 7, 9, 10, 11)
Juan Ramirez – assistant mixing (tracks: 2, 13)
Andrew Chavel – assistant mixing (track 3)
Chris Frame – assistant mixing (track 6)
Peter DiRado – assistant mixing (track 8)
Brian "Big Bass" Gardner – mastering
Mike Baiardi – digital editing, Pro Tools
Will Ragland – digital illustration, design
Craig Marshall – A&R

Charts

References

External links

2003 debut albums
Roscoe (rapper) albums
Priority Records albums
Albums produced by Def Jef
Albums produced by DJ Quik
Albums produced by Soopafly
Albums produced by L.T. Hutton
Albums produced by Organized Noize